Hee Haw is an American television variety show featuring country music and humor with the fictional rural "Kornfield Kounty" as the backdrop. It aired first-run on CBS from 1969 to 1971, in syndication from 1971 to 1993, and on TNN from 1996 to 1997. Reruns of the series were broadcast on RFD-TV from September 2008 to April 2020, and aired on Circle.

The show was inspired by Rowan & Martin's Laugh-In, but centered on country music, rural rather than pop culture-inspired humor, and with far less topical material. Hosted by country music artists Buck Owens and Roy Clark for most of its run, the show was equally well known for its cornpone humor as for its voluptuous, scantily clad women (the "Hee Haw Honeys") in stereotypical farmer's daughter outfits.

Hee Haws appeal, however, was not limited to a rural audience. It was successful in all of the major markets, including network-based Los Angeles and New York City, as well as Boston and Chicago. Other niche programs such as The Lawrence Welk Show and Soul Train, which targeted older and black audiences, respectively, also rose to prominence in syndication during the era. Like Laugh-In, the show minimized production costs by taping all of the recurring sketches for a season in batches, setting up the cornfield set one day, the joke fence on another, etc. At the height of its popularity, an entire season's worth of shows was taped in two separate week-long sessions, with individual shows then assembled in the editing room. Only musical performances were taped with a live audience, while a laugh track was added to all other segments.

The series was taped for the CBS Television Network at its station affiliate WLAC-TV (now WTVF) in downtown Nashville, Tennessee, and later at Opryland USA in the city's Donelson area. The show was produced by Yongestreet Productions through the mid-1980s; it was later produced by Gaylord Entertainment, which distributed the show in syndication. The show's name, derived from a common English onomatopoeia used to describe a donkey's braying, was coined by show-business talent manager and producer Bernie Brillstein.

The series initially ended its run in June 1993, after 25 seasons. It was soon picked up by TNN for reruns.

Synopsis 
Hee Haw is set in Kornfield Kounty, a rural farming community in an unspecified state in the Southern United States. The show's sketches mostly center around visits to local businesses in the county and the offbeat characters who live and work there.

Recurring sketches and segments
Some of the most popular sketches and segments on Hee Haw included:
"PFFT! You Was Gone!" — A comedic duet featured on the premiere episode. In the first few seasons, the song was performed by Archie Campbell, with Gordie Tapp joining on the chorus. In later seasons, a guest star would join Campbell (or another cast member, usually Tapp, Grandpa Jones, George Lindsey, Kenny Price, Roni Stoneman, Roy Acuff, or Dub Taylor) on the chorus, and the guest star's name would be mentioned somewhere in the song's verse prior to the chorus. On episodes that featured more than one major guest star, the sketch was repeated so that all the guest stars would have an opportunity to participate. Tapp or the guest star often stood with his or her back to the viewer holding a pitchfork while Campbell, or the other cast member, holding a scythe, sang the verse. At the end of the verse, Campbell or the cast member would nudge Tapp or the guest star with their elbow, as a form of slapstick timing, whereby Tapp or the guest star would then spin around to the camera to join him or her on the chorus:

The "PFFT" would be done as "blowing a raspberry" and occasionally, the duo would break up into laughter after the "PFFT", unable to finish the song; the one who got spat upon during the "PFFT" changed for each show. Following Campbell's death, whole groups and even women would be part of the chorus, with regular George Lindsay often singing the verse. Occasionally, in the later years, Roni Stoneman (in her role of Ida Lee Nagger) would sometimes sing the verse.  The song itself was written years earlier by Bix Reichner and recorded by obscure country singer Bob Newman.
KORN News — Don Harron, as KORN radio announcer Charlie Farquharson, would humorously spoof the delivery of local news, in his own inimitable way. In later seasons, KORN became KORV. Harron had been performing the character since 1952 on Canadian television, and continued playing Farquharson in many other media venues before, during, and after Hee Haw (the fictional radio station is not to be confused with the Mitchell, South Dakota-based KORN (AM) or KORN-FM). 
Lulu's Truck Stop — Lulu Roman owned this greasy spoon, where the food and customer service were usually pretty bad; Gailard Sartain was also in this sketch as the chef Orville, and George Lindsay often appeared in the sketch as their goofy patron.
Hee Haw Players — Cast members take on some of the Shakespeare classics, with some unexpected twists.
Hee Haw Amateur Minute — A showcase of some of the worst talent of all, a cast member would play some yokel who would have some kind of bad talent, which would almost always end up with the audience booing it, throwing vegetables and the hook operator yanking said act forcibly off the stage. After the sketch, animated cartoon animals appeared onscreen booing, as well.
Samuel B. Sternwheeler — Gordie Tapp, in a spoof of author Mark Twain, gives off some homilies, which intentionally made little or no sense whatsoever. After these recitations, he most often was hit over the head with a rubber chicken, or in later years, given a bomb or something that eventually exploded, leaving him covered in soot and a shredded suit.
Stringbean's Letter From Home - Cast members sat around a barn porch setting, listening to Stringbean read a letter that he receives from home. The letters included stories delivered in punch line format.
The Haystack— A male cast member and one of the Hee Haw Honeys talk about love issues while sitting at the haystack.
Colonel Daddy's Daughter — Marianne Gordon was the pampered Southern belle daughter of her Colonel Daddy (Gordie Tapp in his role of Samuel Sternwheeler). She sat on the swing at her plantation home, and spoke about the generosity of her Daddy. In later sketches, Tapp's character was no longer seen, but was always referenced to by his spoiled daughter, though the later seasons had Tapp reprising his role of Samuel Sternwheeler giving romantic advice to his daughter. This sketch replaced the "Samuel B. Sternwheeler" sketch, which had previously been discontinued.
The Moonshiners — Two of the male cast members, playing lethargic hillbillies, lazily told a joke while dozing on the floor near a bunch of moonshine jugs and Beauregard the Wonder Dog (Kingfish the Wonder Dog in earlier seasons, Buford the Wonder Dog in later seasons), with three or four of the Hee Haw Honeys reclining in the background. Occasionally in later seasons, the camera zoomed in on two of the reclining Honeys lazily telling the joke.
School Scenes — School scenes were always scattered throughout the series' run. At first, it was with Jennifer Bishop and Lulu Roman as the put-upon teachers, with most notably Junior Samples and Roy Clark as the students. When Minnie Pearl became the teacher, the set was a larger classroom with, at first, real children as the students, but later returned to the cast members playing children, with Pearl still as the teacher. In the later seasons, George Lindsay, as the school bully, talked about his day in school.
Advice to the Lovelorn — Hee Haw Honey Lisa Todd, reclining on a living room sofa, gave wacky love advice in a sultry manner and closed the sketch by winking at the camera. In later seasons of the sketch, George Lindsay, who provided the voice-over introduction in earlier seasons, now appeared on screen wearing a leisure suit, introducing the sketch. 
The Culhanes of Kornfield Kounty — The adventures of the Culhane family were depicted, as all they did was sit on an old-fashioned sofa in the parlor, which focused on Cousin Clem Culhane (Gordie Tapp), Cousin Junior Culhane (Junior Samples), Cousin Grandpa Culhane (Grandpa Jones), and Cousin Lulu Culhane (Lulu Roman), who would sit in deadpan character and comment, à la soap opera. After the death of Samples, his role was filled by cast member Mike Snider in the role of Cousin Mike.
Pickin' and Grinnin — Musical interludes with Owens (on guitar) and Clark (on banjo) and the entire cast (Owens: "Well, I'm a-pickin'!"; Clark: "And IIIII'm a-grinnin'!"), with the duo (and sometimes a major guest star — such as Johnny Cash — sitting between Owens and Clark) "dueling" by playing guitar and banjo the instrumental to "Cripple Creek," telling jokes and reciting one-liners. The sketch always ended with Clark's banjo solo, each time ending a different comical way. For the first two the sketch featured only Clark and Owens, and in later seasons the entire cast participated. When the entire cast began participating, the sketch was introduced by the show's emcee Cathy Baker. This sketch at first would always open the second half of the show before alternating with the "Hee Haw Honky Tonk" sketch in the later seasons.
Samples Used Car Sales — Junior Samples, as a used car salesman, would try to palm off a major "clunker".
"Gloom, Despair, and Agony On Me" — Another popular sketch, it was usually performed by four male cast members (originally—and usually—Roy Clark; Gordie Tapp; Grandpa Jones and Archie Campbell) sitting around in hillbilly garb surrounded by moonshine jugs and looking overtly miserable. The song began with the chorus, which all of them sang with each one alternating (in lip-synch) a mournful howl after each of the first three lines. The chorus went:

The quartet began by singing the chorus together, followed by each quartet member reciting some humorous reason for his misery in spoken form, then (in the first several seasons) the quartet reprised the chorus and end with all four sobbing in typical overstated manner.

The Gossip Girls — This sketch is the female counterpart to "Gloom, Despair...", which featured four female cast members surrounding a washtub and clothes wringer singing the chorus:

Two of the four girls then sang the verse. Misty Rowe, a long-time member of the "Gossip Girls", enhanced the comedy of the sketch by singing her part of the verse out of tune (as a young child would do). In later years, male cast members, in drag, sometimes replaced the girls in the sketch, in retaliation for the girls singing "Gloom, Despair..." Sometimes, in later seasons, the four female cast members sang the song on the cornfield set, with a male guest star standing in the center, between the four girls.

"Hee Haw Salutes ..." — Two or three times in each episode, Hee Haw saluted a selected town (or a guest star's hometown) and announce its population, which was sometimes altered for levity, at which point the entire cast would then "pop up" in the cornfield set, shouting "SAA-LUTE!!" Initially ending with laughter, this was changed by the mid-1970s to applause as a nod toward legitimately saluting small-town America. Also in the early 1980s, John Henry Faulk saluted a figure in American history, which  received the same appropriate nodding applause. In the later seasons, the cast said "Salute" on the Pickin' and Grinnin' set.
The Joke Fence — Two or three times during each show, a cast member (usually a Honey), standing in front of a high wooden fence, told a one liner joke. (Example: "I crossed an elephant with a gopher." Entire cast in unison: "What'ja get?" "Some awfully big holes in the backyard.") Regardless of whether the joke teller was female or male, a portion of the fence  swung upward and hit them on the buttocks, after the punch line was delivered. (On some versions of the show, the sketch cut to the next scene just before the fence hit the cast member, and especially in earlier seasons, the sketch would freeze-frame at the moment the fence made contact with the joke teller's buttocks.)
Archie's Barber Shop — Archie Campbell, as the local barber, performed with regular customer Roy Clark, and two or three other regulars sitting in the "waiting chairs" (on some occasions Junior Samples or a guest star would be the one going into the barber's chair). Campbell shared comic dialog with Clark or told one of his "backwards fairy tales" such as "Rindercella".
Doc Campbell — This long-running sketch featured Archie Campbell playing the part of a doctor who often gave out terrible advice and bizarre medical "facts". Patients often were one of the show's cast members. The sketch is also remembered for cast member Gunilla Hutton's role as Doc Campbell's assistant, Nurse Goodbody.
Justus O'Peace — This sketch featured Archie Campbell as a judge who wore what looked to be a bowler hat, a red undershirt, and suspenders, sentencing people to long jail time for some of the silliest misdemeanor "crime". Kenny Price also made occasional appearances as the sheriff (in the later seasons, the sketch began with a painting of Ida Lee Nagger depicted as Lady Justice). Years later, Archie's son, Phil Campbell, and Gordie Tapp, appeared in a recurring sketch about two police officers. They also did a courtroom sketch with Dub Taylor as the judge and Gailard Sartain in his role of Cletus Biggs from "Biggs, Shy, and Stir".
"Uh-huh, Oh Yeah!"—Cast member and banjo picker Buck Trent recited a comical poem, talking blues-style (usually about chickens) to his banjo instrumental.

Hee Haw Dictionary — Archie Campbell, dressed in a graduate's cap and gown, gave the definition of a word with a comic twist. Sometimes, wads of paper flew into the scene as a way of punishing the bad joke that was told.
Gordie's General Store — Gordie Tapp was the owner of a general merchandise store. It was also a place where one of the cast members (usually Junior Samples or Grandpa Jones) told a comedic story in early seasons. In later seasons, the focus shifted from Kornfield Kounty residents stopping by to the comedic banter of Tapp and Gailard Sartain, who played the role of Gordie's incompetent employee Maynard, who often sent Tapp into fits of anger or agony by the sketch's end.
"Real Incredible" — This sketch, which ran in the early 1980s, was Hee Haw's parody of TV's two popular reality series that ran during that period: ABC's That's Incredible and NBC's Real People. Don Harron, in his role as Charlie Farquharson, hosted the sketch, comedically introducing it by transposing the shows' two titles: "Welcome to Real Incredible (That's People?!)." Assisted by George Lindsay, the sketch at first showed clips of actual rural folks engaging in unusual activities, but was later spoofed by cast members involved in comical, and obviously fictional, unusual activities.
Misty's Bedtime Stories — This sketch featured bedtime stories delivered by cast member Misty Rowe. Grandpa Jones or George Lindsay was heard off-screen introducing the sketch in a near-whisper, "And now it's time for Misty's Bedtime Stories." Rowe  delivered one of her bizarre stories, sometimes a rewritten nursery rhyme. By the sketch's end, she delivered a comical "moral to the story", giggle, wink at the camera, and blow out the candle.
Empty Arms Hotel — Roy Clark was the head desk clerk at one of the few accommodations in all of Kornfield Kounty, who would pop up from behind the front desk after the bell was rung, usually by a complaining guest.
Goober's Garage — George Lindsay, in his Andy Griffith Show role of Goober, was the owner of the local garage where he would talk about cars and jalopies with whoever appeared in the sketch that week. Sometimes, non-cast member Jack Burns appeared in the sketch as the city slicker/con-artist type trying to pull a fast one, with Goober emerging more intelligent. For a short time in the early 1980s, after Burns' run, Chase Randolph appeared in the sketch as a muscular "hunk" mechanic hired by Goober and being pursued by Honeys Diana Goodman, Misty Rowe, and Nancy Traylor. The running gag of Randolph's run was that Randolph was more interested in fixing up his hot rod than giving in to the advances of the girls, while Goober then offered to go out with the girls, instead — only to strike out miserably. In later seasons, after Randolph's run, Goober was joined in the sketch by Goodman, Rowe, and Lisa Todd as his beautiful but not very bright mechanics.
The Farmer's Daughter — Cast member Linda Thompson was the daughter of a strict farmer (cast member Kenny Price). The running gag in the sketch was that Price always came up with clever ways to thwart Thompson's dates with her boyfriend Billy Bob.
The Weather Girl — A spin-off of "KORN News",  Hee Haw Honey Lisa Todd spoofed the weather forecast. Grandpa Jones appeared with Todd and she determineg the forecast according to the condition of Jones' knee. In later seasons, Gailard Sartain appeared in the sketch as a "human weather map", at first wearing a sweatshirt with a map outline of the United States before transitioning to an inflated globe costume. The running gag during Sartain's run was that Sartain chased Todd off the set by the sketch's end. 
(In later seasons, "KORN News" and "The Weather Girl" merged into one sketch, and Misty Rowe later joined the sketch spoofing local sports news.)
"Hee Haw's All-Jug Band" — A musical sketch, it featured most of the female cast members, singing a comical song, in which the punch line differed each week. Cast member Lulu Roman "played" moonshine jugs (by which, she would blow air over the spout, creating a "humming sound"), which partially explains the sketch's title (as well as the fact that "jugs" is a dysphemism for breasts). Minnie Pearl introduced the sketch each week, loudly announcing, "We're gonna play now!" At the end of the song, she  similarly concluded, "We're through playin' now!"
"Hey Grandpa! What's For Supper?" — Grandpa Jones is cleaning a window pane (with no glass in it, as evidenced by Jones' hand dangling through the window pane as he recites the menu) and when the entire cast (off-camera) asks, "Hey, Grandpa, what's for supper?," he recites a dinner menu in poetic verse. Often, he describes a delicious, country-style meal (e.g., chicken and biscuits smothered in rich gravy, and collard greens), and the cast would reply approvingly, "Yum-m yum-m!" Sometimes, he served a less than spectacular meal (thawed out TV dinners), to which the cast would reply, "Yuck!" One notable run-through of the routine had Grandpa saying, "Ah ain't got nuthin'," which was one of the few times he ever got booed during this routine. The second time was when he offered "a big fresh roast of good moose meat." In the later seasons, Grandpa wore a chef's hat with his head peeking out of an open kitchen doorway, but the menu recitals remained the same.

Grandpa and Minnie's Kitchen — This sketch, which ran throughout most of the 1970s, spoofed TV cooking shows in which Grandpa Jones and Minnie Pearl delivered hilarious recipes that made no sense.
Jerry Ralph R.B. "Bob" Bevis — This sketch appeared mostly in the 1980s, and featured Gailard Sartain as the owner of a small store/flea market attempting to sell junk. The sketch started with a hand-held camera zooming up to the front door and the door being flung open to reveal the fast-talking salesman standing behind the counter surrounded by the junk he was trying to sell. The character was a clown with red cheeks and wild, clown-like hair. The running joke was his attempts at becoming a big singing star, and at the end of every sketch, just as he is preparing to pull out a guitar and starting to sing, the camera  zoomed out and the door swung shut.
Biggs, Shy, & Stir — This featured Gailard Sartain as "Cletus Biggs of Biggs, Shy, & Stir," Kornfield Kounty's most honorable law firm, where our motto is, 'When in doubt, sue!'" He advertised the week's "special" such as "Sue Your Parents Week" or "Sue Your Teacher Week". He always concluded the sketch by saying, "Remember, we're in the alley behind the courthouse above the pool hall!"
The Cornfield — Vignettes patterned after Laugh-In's "Joke Wall," it had cast members and guest stars "popping up" to tell jokes and one-liners. Until his death, Stringbean played the field's scarecrow, delivering one-liners before being shouted down by the crow on his shoulder; after his 1973 murder, Stringbean was not replaced, and a wooden scarecrow was simply seen in the field as a memorial. Guest stars often participated in this sketch, as well; on occasion, personalities from TV stations that carried Hee Haw, as well as country-music radio personalities, appeared in this sketch with Owens or Clark.
The Naggers — This sketch featured Gordie Tapp and Roni Stoneman as LaVern and Ida Lee Nagger, a backwoods bickering couple, inspired in part by the radio comedy The Bickersons. Kenny Price made occasional appearances (starting in 1974) as their son Elrod; Wendy Suits of the show's background singing group, the Nashville Edition, sometimes played Ida Lee's equally (and deaf) nagging mother.
Kornfield Kounty Operator Assistance — Irlene Mandrell, as Kornfield Kounty's telephone operator (similar to Lily Tomlin's more famous character, Ernestine Tomlin), answered phone calls from various Kornfield Kounty residents, who would eventually hang up in various degrees of frustration, causing operator Mandrell to often say, innocently, "And they wonder why we telephone operators turn gray!"
Grinder's Switch Gazette—This sketch featured Minnie Pearl as the manager of the local newspaper, who often insisted that her mute secretary, Miss Honeydew (Victoria Hallman), take down an "important" news item, which was always nonsense.
About 200 Years Ago — This sketch, which ran in 1976 in celebration of the bicentennial year, was a parody of CBS' "Bicentennial Minutes"; in the sketch, Grandpa Jones delivered a fractured historical "fact" about the Revolutionary War era. Jones then concluded the sketch with a knockoff of Walter Cronkite's signature signoff line, "I'm Grandpa Jones and that's the way it was, 200 years ago...er, more or less."
The Almanac — A sketch that ran in the late 1970s, Grandpa Jones delivered almanac entries that made no sense. Jones then concluded the sketch with a knockoff of the proverb "truth is stranger than fiction," with Jones replacing the word "fiction" with the name of a well-known celebrity.
Archie's Angels — Aired in the mid-1970s, this sketch was Hee Haw's knockoff of Charlie's Angels, the popular TV crime show from that period. Three of the Honeys portrayed the Angels, with Archie Campbell's voice giving them humorous "assignments" over an intercom, as with the actual Charlie's Angels TV show.
"Let's Truck Together" — This sketch reflected the CB radio craze during the mid- to late 1970s. Kenny Price and Gailard Sartain, as truck drivers, swapped funny stories and one-liners with each other over the CB airwaves.
Hee Haw Honky Tonk — With the Urban Cowboy craze in full swing in the early 1980s, Hee Haw answered with its very own Urban Cowboy-esque honky-tonk (even Buck Owens developed an Urban Cowboy look by growing a beard and donning a cowboy hat, and kept this image for the next several seasons). The sketch was a spinoff of "Pickin' and Grinnin'" with cast members, as patrons of the honky tonk, throwing out one-liners between parts of the "Hee Haw Honky Tonk" song. The honky tonk was replete with its mechanical bull, and also included a background conversation track during the one-liners to add to the realism of an actual nightclub. The sketch also at times featured Roni Stoneman, in her role of Ida Lee Nagger, chasing men with a net. The sketch was also patterned after the party on Laugh-In. The "Hee Haw Honky Tonk" set also became the main stage for most of the musical performances for the rest of the series' run.
Kurl Up and Dye — This sketch from the show's later years featured several of the cast members in a beauty parlor where they could gossip. From time to time, Gailard Sartain appeared in drag as one of the fussy women.
Fit as a Fiddle — This sketch ran in the 1980s to reflect the aerobic-dancing craze of that period. The sketch featured several of the cast members, including Diana Goodman, Victoria Hallman, Gunilla Hutton, Misty Rowe, Nancy Traylor, Linda Thompson, Jeff Smith, Jackie Waddell, and Kelly Billingsey, delivering one-liner jokes while aerobic dancing. Sometimes, cast member Smith (later Roni Stoneman) was seen on an exercise cycle in the background.
Slim Pickens' Bar-B-Q — Slim Pickens had his friends over at a barbecue at his home, where a musical guest or cast members would perform. The segment always opened by spoofing Burma Shave road signs, as some of the cast members were seen piled on a truck driving down the road to Slim Pickens' Bar-B-Q, whose guests often complained about the food, to which Pickens countered with something like, "I may not have prime meat at this picnic, but I do have prime entertainment!" Then, he brought out the entertainment (the guest star's or cast members' performance).
The Post Office — Minnie Pearl and Grandpa Jones ran the post office, often dealing with (mostly) unhappy customers.
The Quilt — Minnie Pearl gave romantic advice to several of the Hee Haw Honeys while sitting around in a circle, making a quilt.
Knock Knock — Buck Owens told a knock-knock joke to an unsuspecting cast member or guest star. If the guest star were a major country artist, the joke would be written to reveal the punch-line answer to be the title to one of the singer's biggest hits, which Owens  then sang badly on purpose.
The Hambone Brothers — Jackie Phelps did some rhythmic knee-slapping (known as hambone), while Jimmy Riddle eefed.
Stories from John Henry Faulk and Rev. Grady Nutt — Beginning in the late 1970s, John Henry Faulk, followed in later seasons by Rev. Grady Nutt, sat around in a circle with some of the male cast members on the set of Gordie's General Store telling some of their humorous stories (very much in the same manner Grandpa Jones and Junior Samples did in the early seasons). At the beginning of Grady Nutt's sketches, Grandpa Jones introduced Nutt as "Hee Haw's very own Prime Minister of Humor." These sketches discontinued after Nutt's death in a plane crash in 1982.
Ben Colder — A singer of cheesy parodies of popular country songs, Sheb Wooley had created the character before the show began and portrayed the character during his time on the show and his guest appearances.
Claude Strawberry, Country Poet — Roy Clark played a poet reminiscent of Mark Twain, who would recite poems with a country twist. 
The Little Yellow Chicken — An animated little yellow chicken always mistook anything and everything for an egg. The chicken would sit on items, such as a ringside bell, a man's bald head, a billiard ball, a football, a golf ball and even a bomb, with various disastrous results. The little chicken was produced by Format Films.
Animated Critters — Interspersed within the show, besides the above-mentioned chicken, were various applauding or laughing animated farm animals; a kickline composed of pigs during an instrumental performance; a pack of dogs that chased an extremely bad joke teller; three sultry pigs that twirled their necklaces during an instrumental performance; a square-dancing female pig and a male donkey to an instrumental performance; a pair of chickens dancing, with one of them falling flat on its face; the ubiquitous Hee Haw donkey, that would say quips such as, "Wouldn't that dunk your hat in the creek," and a pig (from the kickline) that would sneak up on a musical guest (or a cast member, mostly Roy Clark), kiss him on the cheek, and sneak off after his performance. Sometimes, certain animals carried appropriate signs with some kind of quip (e.g. the Hee Haw donkey holding a sign that said, "I'm looking for a "She-Haw!" or in later years, "Let us Bray!"

Guest stars often participated in some of the sketches (mostly the "PFFT! You Was Gone" and "The Cornfield" sketches); however, this did not occur until later seasons.

Cast
Two rural-style comedians, already well known in their native Canada, Gordie Tapp and Don Harron (whose KORN Radio character, newscaster Charlie Farquharson, had been a fixture of Canadian television since 1952 and later appeared on The Red Green Show), gained their first major U.S. exposure on Hee Haw.

Other cast members over the years included:
Roy Acuff,
Cathy Baker (as the show's emcee),
Willie Ackerman,
Billy Jim Baker,
Barbi Benton,
Kelly Billingsley,
Vicki Bird,
Jennifer Bishop,
Archie Campbell,
Phil Campbell,
Harry Cole (Weeping Willie),
Mackenzie Colt,
John Henry Faulk,
Tennessee Ernie Ford,
Diana Goodman,
Marianne Gordon (Rogers), 
Jim and Jon Hager,
Victoria Hallman,
Little Jimmy Henley,
Gunilla Hutton,
Linda Johnson,
Grandpa Jones,
Zella Lehr (the "unicycle girl"),
George Lindsey (reprising his "Goober" character from The Andy Griffith Show),
Little Jimmy Dickens,
Irlene Mandrell,
Charlie McCoy,
Dawn McKinley,
Patricia McKinnon,
Sherry Miles,
Rev. Grady Nutt,
Minnie Pearl,
Claude "Jackie" Phelps,
Slim Pickens,
Kenny Price,
Anne Randall,
Chase Randolph,
Susan Raye,
Jimmie Riddle,
Jeannine Riley,
Alice Ripley,
Lulu Roman,
Misty Rowe,
Junior Samples,
Ray Sanders,
Terry Sanders,
Gailard Sartain,
Diana Scott,
Shotgun Red,
Gerald Smith (the "Georgia Quacker"),
Jeff Smith,
Mike Snider,
Donna Stokes,
Dennis Stone,
Roni Stoneman,
Mary Taylor,
Nancy Taylor,
Linda Thompson,
Lisa Todd,
Pedro Tomas,
Nancy Traylor, 
Buck Trent,
Jackie Waddell, 
Pat Woodell, and
Jonathan Winters, among many others.

The Buckaroos (Buck Owens' band) initially served as the house band on the show and consisted of members Don Rich, Jim Shaw, Jerry Brightman, Jerry Wiggins, Rick Taylor, Doyle Singer (Doyle Curtsinger), Don Lee, Ronnie Jackson, Terry Christoffersen, Doyle Holly and, in later seasons, fiddle player Jana Jae and Victoria Hallman, who replaced Don Rich on harmony vocals (Rich was killed in a motorcycle accident in 1974). In later seasons, the show hired Nashville musicians to serve as the show's "house band." George Richey was the first music director. When he left to marry Tammy Wynette, harmonica player Charlie McCoy, already a member of the band when he was not playing on recording sessions, became the show's music director, forming the Hee Haw Band, which became the house band for the remainder of the series' run. The Nashville Edition, a singing quartet consisting of two males and two females, served as the background singers for most of the musical performances, along with performing songs on their own.

Some of the cast members made national headlines: Lulu Roman was twice charged with drug possession in 1971; David "Stringbean" Akeman and his wife were murdered in November 1973 during a robbery at their home; Slim Pickens, less than two years after joining the series, was diagnosed with a fatal brain tumor, and, as mentioned above, Don Rich of the Buckaroos was killed in a motorcycle crash in 1974.

Some cast members, such as Charlie McCoy and Tennessee Ernie Ford, originally appeared on the show as guest stars; while Barbi Benton and Sheb Wooley returned in later seasons only as guest stars.

After Buck Owens left the show, a different country music artist would accompany Roy Clark as a guest co-host each week, who would give the episode's opening performance, participate with Clark in the "Pickin' and Grinnin'" sketch, and assist Clark in introducing the other guest stars' performances.  The show's final season (Hee Haw Silver) was hosted by Clark alone.

Guest stars
Hee Haw featured at least two, and sometimes three or four, guest celebrities each week. While most of the guest stars were country music artists, a wide range of other famous luminaries were featured from actors and actresses to sports stars to politicians.

Sheb Wooley, one of the original cast members, wrote the show's theme song. After filming the initial 13 episodes, other professional demands caused him to leave the show, but he returned from time to time as a guest star.

Loretta Lynn was the first guest star of Hee Haw and made more guest appearances (24) than any other artist. She also co-hosted the show more than any other guest co-host and therefore appears on more of the DVD releases for retail sale than any other guest star. Tammy Wynette was second with 21 guest appearances, and Wynette married George Richey (the musical director for Hee Haw from 1970 to 1977) in 1978.

From 1990–92, country megastar Garth Brooks appeared on the show four times. In 1992, producer Sam Lovullo tried unsuccessfully to contact Brooks because he wanted him for the final show. Brooks then surprised Lovullo by showing up at the last minute, ready to don his overalls and perform for the final episode.

Elvis connection

Elvis Presley was a fan of Hee Haw and wanted to appear as a guest on the program, but Presley knew his manager, Colonel Tom Parker, would not allow him to do so (following Presley's death, Parker would be sued by Elvis Presley Enterprises for mismanagement). Two of the Hee Haw Honeys dated Presley long before they joined the cast: Linda Thompson in the mid-1970s, whom Presley had a long-term relationship with after his divorce from Priscilla; and Diana Goodman shortly afterwards. Charlie McCoy played harmonica on a select few of Presley's recordings in the late 1960s, Joe Babcock of the Nashville Edition also sang backup vocals on a couple of his recordings at that time, and the Nashville Edition sang backup on Presley's recording of "Early Morning Rain." Shortly after Presley's death, his father, Vernon Presley, made a cameo appearance on the show, alongside Thompson and Buck Owens, and paid tribute to his late son, noting how much Elvis enjoyed watching the show, and introduced one of his favorite gospel songs, which was performed by the Hee Haw Gospel Quartet.

Production

Creation
Hee Haw's creators, Frank Peppiatt and John Aylesworth, were both Canadian-born writers who had extensive experience in writing for variety shows. Inspired by the enormous prior success of rural sitcoms of the 1960s, especially on CBS, which included the small-town sympathetic The Andy Griffith Show, followed by the country-parodying The Beverly Hillbillies, Petticoat Junction and Green Acres, Peppiatt and Aylesworth sought to create a variety show catering to the same audience—although neither one had a firm grasp on rural comedy.

The producers selected a pair of hosts who represented each side in a divide in country/western music at the time: Buck Owens was a prominent architect of the California-based Bakersfield sound and one of the biggest country hitmakers of the 1960s. Roy Clark, who had worked in Washington, D.C. and Las Vegas, was a stalwart of Nashville's Music Row known for his skill at mixing music and comedy onstage. Both Clark and Owens had been regular guests on The Jimmy Dean Show during Peppiatt and Aylesworth's time writing for that series. Peppiatt and Aylesworth brought on two fellow Canadian writers with more experience in rural humor, Gordie Tapp and Don Harron; Harron would appear in the recurring role of "Charlie Farquharson", the rural anchorman for station KORN.  The producers also scored a country comedy expert familiar to rural audiences in Archie Campbell, who co-starred in and wrote many of the jokes and sketches, along with Tapp, George Yanok and comedian Jack Burns (who himself had briefly replaced Don Knotts on The Andy Griffith Show) in the first season.

Stage settings
A barn interior set was used as the main stage for most of the musical performances from the show's premiere until the debut of the "Hee Haw Honky Tonk" sketch in the early 1980s. Afterwards, the "Hee Haw Honky Tonk" set would serve as the main stage for the remainder of the series' run. Buck Owens then began using the barn interior set for his performances after it was replaced by the "Hee Haw Honky Tonk" set and was named "Buck's Place" (as a nod to one of Owens' hits, "Sam's Place"). Other settings for the musical performances throughout the series' run included a haystack (where the entire cast performed songs), the living room of a Victorian house, the front porch and lawn of the Samuel B. Sternwheeler home, a grist mill (where Roy Clark performed many of his songs in earlier seasons), and a railroad depot, where Buck Owens performed his songs before acquiring "Buck's Place."

Music
Hee Haw featured a premiere showcase on commercial television throughout its run for country, bluegrass, gospel, and other styles of American traditional music, featuring hundreds of elite musical performances that were paramount to the success, popularity and legacy of the series for a broad audience of Southern, rural and purely music fans alike. Although country music was the primary genre of music featured on the show, guest stars and cast members alike also performed music from other genres, such as rock 'n' roll oldies, big band, and pop standards.

Some of the music-based segments on the show (other than guest stars' performances) included:
The Million Dollar Band — This was an instrumental band formed of legendary Nashville musicians Chet Atkins (guitar), Boots Randolph (saxophone), Roy Clark (guitar), Floyd Cramer (piano), Charlie McCoy (harmonica), Danny Davis (trumpet), Jethro Burns (mandolin), Johnny Gimble (fiddle), backed by a rhythm section consisting of Nashville session super pickers Willie Ackerman (drums), Henry Strzelecki (Bass) and Bobby Thompson (banjo/acoustic guitar); who would frequently appear on the show from 1980 through 1988. The band would perform an instrumental version of a popular song, with each member showcasing his talent on his respective instrument.
The Hee Haw Gospel Quartet — Beginning in the latter part of the 1970s, this group sang a gospel hymn just before the show's closing. The original lineup consisted of Buck Owens (lead), Roy Clark (tenor), Grandpa Jones (baritone), and Tennessee Ernie Ford (bass).  Ford was later replaced by Kenny Price.  In contrast to Hee Haw's general levity, the Quartet's performance was appropriately  treated solemnly, with no laughter or applause from the audience. Jones did not wear his signature hat during the segment, and would frequently appear entirely out of his "Grandpa" costume. In the first few seasons that featured the Quartet, cast member Lulu Roman would introduce the group along with the hymn they were about to perform. Several of the Quartet's performances were released as recordings. Joe Babcock took over as lead singer after Owens left the show, and Ray Burdette took over as bass singer after the death of Kenny Price; but the Quartet was not featured as often from that point on. However, the show still closed with a gospel song—if not by the Quartet, then by either the entire cast, a guest gospel artist, or cast member Lulu Roman (a gospel artist in her own right). The concept of the Quartet was based on the 1940s group the Brown's Ferry Four, which recorded for King Records and included Grandpa Jones, the Delmore Brothers and Merle Travis. Jones suggested the idea to the show's producers, supported by Clark.
The Hagers — This twin brother singing duo would also perform a song each week on the show. They would often perform their own versions of pop/rock songs from the 1960s and '70s.
Performances by cast members — In addition to hosts Buck Owens and Roy Clark, who would perform at least one song each week, other cast members—such as Gunilla Hutton, Misty Rowe, Victoria Hallman, Grandpa Jones (sometimes with his wife Ramona), Kenny Price, Archie Campbell, Barbi Benton, The Nashville Edition, Vicki Bird, and Diana Goodman—would occasionally perform a song on the show; and the show would almost always open with a song performed by the entire cast.
The Hee Haw Cowboy Quartet — This group, patterned after the Hee Haw Gospel Quartet, was short-lived, having formed near the end of the series' run. Like the group name suggests; the quartet, dressed in cowboy costumes, would perform a western song in the style of the Sons of the Pioneers on a Western-style stage setting.
Cloggers — Throughout the 1980s, several champion clogging groups would frequently appear on the show, performing their clogging routines.
Child singers — For a brief time in the late '70s/early '80s, child singers, mostly in the 10- to 12-year-old bracket, would occasionally appear on the show performing a popular song. Such guests included Kathy Kitchen (whom guest star Faron Young introduced), Stacy Lynn Ries, and Cheryl Handy.

Lovullo also has made the claim the show presented "what were, in reality, the first musical videos." Lovullo said his videos were conceptualized by having the show's staff go to nearby rural areas and film animals and farmers, before editing the footage to fit the storyline of a particular song. "The video material was a very workable production item for the show," he wrote. "It provided picture stories for songs. However, some of our guests felt the videos took attention away from their live performances, which they hoped would promote record sales. If they had a hit song, they didn't want to play it under comic barnyard footage." The concept's mixed reaction eventually spelled an end to the "video" concept on Hee Haw. However, several of co-host Owens' songs – including "Tall, Dark Stranger," "Big in Vegas", and "I Wouldn't Live in New York City (If They Gave Me the Whole Dang Town)" – aired on the series and have since aired on Great American Country and CMT as part of their classic country music programming blocks.

Release

Broadcast
Hee Haw premiered on CBS in 1969 as a summer series. The show played to the rural routes of its humor with the producers arranging with the network to have the show segments recorded and edited in Nashville at CBS affiliate WLAC-TV (now WTVF).  The network picked it up as a last-minute replacement for The Smothers Brothers Comedy Hour, a popular but controversial variety show that had been canceled amid feuds between the Smothers Brothers and the network censors over the show's topical humor. 

Though Hee Haw had solid ratings overall (it sat at  No. 16 for the 1970-71 season), it was dropped in July 1971 by CBS as part of the so-called "Rural Purge" that abruptly cancelled all of the network's country-themed shows, including those with still-respectable ratings. The success of shows like Hee Haw was the source of a heated dispute in CBS's corporate offices: Vice President of network programming Michael Dann, although he personally disliked the shows, argued in favor of ratings (reflecting audience size), while his subordinate, Fred Silverman, head of daytime programming, held that certain demographics within total television viewership — in which Hee Haw and the others performed poorly — could draw more advertising dollars. Silverman's view won out, Dann was fired, Silverman promoted, and CBS cancelled its rural shows in the summer of 1971.

Syndication
Undaunted, and noting that one instigating factor for the rural purge—the Prime Time Access Rule—had opened up an opportunity for independent syndicated productions, Hee Haw's producers put together a syndication deal for the show, which continued in roughly the same format for the rest of its run. Peppiatt and Aylesworth's company, Yongestreet Productions (named for Yonge Street, a prominent thoroughfare in their home city of Toronto), maintained ownership of the series.

At its peak, Hee Haw often competed in syndication against The Lawrence Welk Show, a long-running ABC program which had likewise been cancelled in 1971, in its case in a purge of the networks' older demographic-leaning programs. Like Hee Haw, Lawrence Welk was picked up for syndication in the fall of 1971, in some markets by the same stations. The success of the two shows in syndication, and the network decisions that led to their respective cancellations, were the inspiration for a novelty song, "The Lawrence Welk-Hee Haw Counter-Revolution Polka", performed by Clark; it rose to become a top 10 hit on the Billboard Hot Country Singles chart in the fall of 1972.

Welk and Hee Haw also competed against another music-oriented niche program that moved to syndication in 1971, Soul Train.  Originally a local program based in Chicago, the black-oriented program also went on to a very long run in syndication; unlike either program, Soul Train entered the market after achieving success at the local level.

In 1981, Yongestreet was acquired by Gaylord Entertainment (best known for the Grand Ole Opry and its related businesses). Mirroring the long downward trend in the popularity of variety shows in general that had taken place in the 1970s, ratings began to decline for Hee Haw around 1986. That year, Owens departed as host, leaving Clark to continue with a celebrity guest host each week. The ratings decline continued into the early 1990s.  In the fall of 1991, in an attempt to win back viewers, attract a younger audience, and keep pace with sweeping changes in the country music industry of the era, the show's format and setting underwent a dramatic overhaul. The changes included a new title (The Hee Haw Show), more pop-oriented country music, and the barnyard-cornfield setting replaced by a city street and shopping mall set. The first of the new episodes aired in January 1992. The changes alienated many of the show's longtime viewers while failing to gain the hoped-for younger viewers, and the ratings continued their decline.

During the summer of 1992, a decision was made to end first-run production, and instead air highlights of the show's earlier years in a revamped program called Hee Haw Silver (as part of celebrating the show's 25th season). Under the new format, Clark hosted a mixture of classic clips and new footage.

Hee Haw Silver episodes also aired a series of retrospective looks at performers who had died since performing in highlighted content, such as David "Stringbean" Akeman, Archie Campbell, Junior Samples, and Kenny Price. According to the show's producer, Sam Lovullo, the ratings showed improvement with these classic reruns; however, the series was finally cancelled in June 1993 at the conclusion of its 25th season. Hee Haw continued to pop up in reruns throughout the 1990s and later during the following decade in a series of successful DVD releases from Time Life.

Reruns
After the show's syndication run ended, reruns aired on The Nashville Network from 1993 until 1995. Upon the cancellation of reruns in 1995, the program resurfaced a year later, for another run of reruns, ultimately concluding in 1997. Its 22 years in TV syndication (1971–93) was, during its latter years, tied with Soul Train with the record for the longest-running American syndicated TV program (Soul Train continued until 2006); Hee Haw, as of 2019, ranks the sixth longest-running syndicated American TV program and the longest-running of its genre (the current record is Entertainment Tonight, which has been on the air for  years; aside from that and Soul Train, Wheel of Fortune, Jeopardy! and Inside Edition rank ahead of it, with Judge Judy surpassing Hee Haw in September 2019).

During the 2006–07 season CMT aired a series of reruns and TV Land also recognized the series with an award presented by k.d. lang; in attendance were Roy Clark, Gunilla Hutton, Barbi Benton, the Hager twins, Linda Thompson, Misty Rowe, and others. It was during this point, roughly between the years of 2004 and 2007, that Time Life began selling selected episodes of the show on DVD. Among the DVD content offered was the 1978 10th anniversary special that had not been seen since its original airing. CMT sporadically aired the series, usually in graveyard slots, and primarily held the rights in order to be able to air the musical performances as part of their music video library (such as during the "Pure Vintage" block on CMT Pure Country).

Reruns of Hee Haw began airing on RFD-TV in September 2008, where it ran for 12 years, anchoring the network's Sunday night lineup, although beginning in January 2014 an episode airs on Saturday afternoon and the same episode is rerun the following Sunday night; those episodes were cut down to comply with the 44-minute minimum. In 2011, the network began re-airing the earliest episodes from 1969–70 on Thursday evenings. That summer, many of the surviving cast members, along with a number of country artists who were guest stars on the show, taped a Country's Family Reunion special, entitled Salute to the Kornfield, which aired on RFD-TV in January 2012. The special is also part of Country's Family Reunions DVD series. Concurrent with the special was the unveiling of a Hee Haw exhibit, titled Pickin' and Grinnin' , at the Oklahoma History Center in Oklahoma City.

Hee Haw left RFD-TV in 2020 and began airing on the Grand Ole Opry-operated Circle network.

As part of the promotions for its DVD products, Time-Life also compiles and syndicates a half-hour clip show series The Hee Haw Collection.

Reception

Nielsen ratings

When Hee Haw went into syndication, many stations aired the program on Saturday evening in the early fringe hour, generally at 7:00pm ET / PT. But as Hee Haw was syndicated and not restrained by the scheduling of a network, stations could schedule the program at any day or time that they saw fit.

Legacy
Hee Haw continues to remain popular with its long-time fans and younger viewers who have discovered the program through DVD releases or its reruns through the years on TNN, CMT, RFD-TV, and now Circle TV. In spite of the popularity among its fans, the program has never been a favorite of television critics or reviewers; the Hee Haw Honeys spin-off, in particular, was cited in a 2002 TV Guide article as one of the 10 worst television series ever.

In popular culture

In the third season episode of The Simpsons "Colonel Homer", Hee Haw is parodied as the TV show Ya Hoo!.

On at least four episodes of the animated Fox series Family Guy, when the storyline hits a dead-end, a cutaway to Conway Twitty performing a song is inserted. The hand-off is done in Hee Haw style, and often uses actual footage of Twitty performing on the show.

Lulu Roman released a new album titled At Last on January 15, 2013. The album features Lulu's versions of 12 classics and standards, including guest appearances by Dolly Parton, T. Graham Brown, Linda Davis, and Georgette Jones (daughter of George Jones and Tammy Wynette).

The series was referenced in The Critic as a parody crossover with Star Trek: The Next Generation under the title of Hee Haw: The Next Generation, where the characters of the Star Trek series act out as the cast of Hee Haw.

Other Media

Hee Haw Honeys (spin-off series)
Hee Haw produced a short-lived spin-off series, Hee Haw Honeys, for the 1978–79 television season. This musical sitcom starred Kathie Lee Johnson (Gifford) along with Hee Haw regulars Misty Rowe, Gailard Sartain, Lulu Roman, and Kenny Price as a family who owned a truck stop restaurant (likely inspired by the "Lulu's Truck Stop" sketch on Hee Haw). Their restaurant included a bandstand, where guest country artists would perform a couple of their hits of the day, sometimes asking the cast to join them. Cast members would also perform songs occasionally; and the Nashville Edition, Hee Haw's backup singing group, frequently appeared on the show, portraying regular patrons of the restaurant. Notable guest stars on Honeys included, but were not limited to: Loretta Lynn, The Oak Ridge Boys, Larry Gatlin, Dave & Sugar, and the Kendalls. Some stations that carried Hee Haw would air an episode of Honeys prior to Hee Haw.

Hee Haw Theater
The Hee Haw Theater opened in Branson, Missouri in 1981 and operated through 1983. It featured live shows using the cast of the television series, as well as guests and other talent. The format was similar with a country variety show-type family theme.

Comic book adaptations
Charlton Comics also published humor comics based on Hee Haw. They were drawn by Frank Roberge.

Footnotes

References

External links

Hee Haw on RFD-TV

Riddle & Phelps place third in TV Greats Countdown
Voices of Oklahoma interview with Roy Clark. First person interview conducted on August 15, 2011, with Roy Clark, star of Hee Haw
Cowboy Joe Babcock Interview NAMM Oral History Library (2021)

1969 American television series debuts
1997 American television series endings
1960s American sketch comedy television series
1970s American sketch comedy television series
1980s American sketch comedy television series
1990s American sketch comedy television series
1960s American variety television series
1970s American variety television series
1980s American variety television series
1990s American variety television series
American country music
Bluegrass music
CBS original programming
Country music television series
English-language television shows
First-run syndicated television programs in the United States
Rural society in the United States
Television shows adapted into plays
Television shows adapted into comics
1970s American television series
American television series with live action and animation
Comedy franchises
Television series by Gaylord Entertainment Company